Aegista subchinensis is a species of air-breathing land snail, a terrestrial pulmonate gastropod mollusc in the family Camaenidae. This species is endemic to the island of Formosa.

References

 Hsieh, B.-C., Hwang, C.-C. & Wu, S.-P. (2006). Landsnails of Taiwan. Forestry Bureau Council of Agriculture Executive Yuan, Taipei. 278 pp.
page(s): 250

External links
 Huang, C.-W.; Lee, Y.-C.; Lin, S.-M.; Wu, W.-L. (2014). Taxonomic revision of Aegista subchinensis (Möllendorff, 1884) (Stylommatophora, Bradybaenidae) and a description of a new species of Aegista from eastern Taiwan based on multilocus phylogeny and comparative morphology. ZooKeys. 445: 31-55

subchinensis
Gastropods described in 1884